On 30 May 2017, an ice cream parlor in Karrada district of Baghdad, Iraq was attacked by an ISIS suicide bomber, killing at least 26 people.

Attack
The bombing took place shortly after midnight, when the car bomb that was parked near the ice cream shop detonated. Islamic state have said the blast targeted Shia followers.

The bombing occurred during Ramadan and was timed to target families going out for ice cream after iftar.

References

2017 murders in Iraq
21st-century mass murder in Iraq
2017 murders in Asia
2010s in Baghdad
ISIL terrorist incidents in Iraq
Islamic terrorist incidents in 2017
Marketplace attacks in Iraq
Mass murder in 2017
Mass murder in Iraq
May 2017 crimes in Asia
May 2017 events in Iraq
Suicide car and truck bombings in Iraq
2017-05
Terrorist incidents in Iraq in 2017
Explosions in 2017